Curaçao International Airport , also known as Hato International Airport (formerly Dr. Albert Plesman International Airport), is the only airport for the island of Curaçao. The airport is located on the north coast of Curaçao,  from the capital Willemstad. Curaçao International Airport services flights from the Caribbean region, South America, North America and Europe and has the third longest commercial runway in the Caribbean region after Rafael Hernández Airport in Puerto Rico and Pointe-à-Pitre International Airport in Guadeloupe. The airport serves as a main base for Divi Divi Air, Jetair Caribbean as well as EZAir; it formerly served as a main base for ALM, KLM, DCA, DAE and Insel Air.

Located on the Dutch Caribbean island of Curaçao, the airport connects Europe, the Americas and the Caribbean. Curaçao International Airport is served by several airlines. It has one of the longest runways in the Caribbean, accommodating up to a Boeing 747. In the early fall of 2014, Curaçao International Airport opened a new General Aviation Center offering premier service in a separate building with a private entrance and exit and special amenities.

History

The airport was initially called Hato Airport, namesake to the nearby town of Hato. On Tuesday, 5 January 1954, the airport was renamed Dr. Albert Plesman airport. Plesman, director of the Royal Dutch Airlines for the Netherlands and Colonies, had died a few days earlier. Often it was spoken of Aeropuerto Plesman or Plesman Airport, unofficially also the name Hato remained in use till this day. Nowadays the official name is Curaçao International Airport. It will be unnecessary to set out in detail, of which it is of paramount importance, that the Dutch aviation industry gets a firm footing in the vicinity of the Caribbean sea, where air traffic is now becoming more and more a factor of economic significance.' - Albert Plesman''
With the above argument in March 1934 Albert Plesman, director of KLM, hoped to receive financial support from the Comité Vliegtocht Nederland-Indië. It was a new plan to head to the West. In the 1920s it started to interest itself in the Caribbean region. Curaçao was developing itself in a beneficial way due to the presence of the oil refinery and a growing number of people were starting to choose the region with the purpose of vacationing. Aviation companies were paying close attention to these developments and were researching if it was possible to create a connection between the United States, Curaçao and South America. The West Indische Gouvernement constructed a runway at the Hato plantation in Curaçao,

On 22 December 1934 the Snip plane arrived in Curaçao after an 8th day during trip with the route Amsterdam-Marseille-Alicante-Casablanca-Porto Praia-Paramaribo-La Guaria-Curaçao.

Hato was one of the most important and busiest airports in the Caribbean during the Second World War. The airfield was used by the US Air Force for patrols against submarines.

During the 1960s the 'Bestuurscollege' commissioned Netherlands Airport Consultants B.V. (NACO) to design a Master plan for the airport. This assignment was in connection with the expected arrival of the Boeing 747. The 'Jumbo' first flew on 9 February 1969.

Curaçao International Airport N.V. (Curinta) was founded in 1977 and operated the Airport until 2013. Its predecessor was the 'Luchthavenbedrijf', which was a department of the Government of Curaçao.

World War II
During World War II, the airport was used by the United States Army Air Forces Sixth Air Force conducting antisubmarine patrols. Flying units using the airfield were:

 59th Bombardment Squadron (VI Bomber Command) 10 March 1942 – 13 July 1943 (A-20 Havoc)
 32d Fighter Squadron (36th Fighter Group, Antilles Air Command, XXVI Fighter Command) 9 March 1943 – 13 March 1944, (P-40 Warhawk)
 Detachment operated from: Dakota Field, Aruba, 9 March 1943 – 9 March 1944
Detachment operated from: Losey Army Airfield, Puerto Rico, 9 March – 4 June 1944
25th Bombardment Group (VI Bomber Command), 1 August – 5 October 1943

Airport Expansion Project
Curaçao Airport Partners (CAP) started off the expansion and visible enhancement of Curaçao International Airport as part of the Airport Expansion Project:
2014: Enhancement and expansion of the Check-In area and airport boulevard.
2016: Groundbreaking Ceremony of the Curaçao International Airport Terminal Expansion Project.
2016: Inauguration Arrivals Hall and inauguration of airport food&beverages services and stores. CAP now also provides a safer landside flow, as the 'road' right in front of the airport has been adjusted into a boulevard for pedestrians. Families, kids, airport employees and users can safely enjoy this area of the airport, while having a clear overview of the surroundings.
Spantenbier Terminal Expansion on 1 June.

The Spantenbier and Terminal Expansion
The Terminal Expansion Project is a crucial component of the Airport Expansion Project. The SPANTENBIER of the expanded eastern part of the terminal marks yet another important milestone in the Airport Expansion Project. 
Important partner in this development is governmental company Curaçao Airport Holding, which is also investing significantly in the realization of the Terminal Expansion Project.
Following this milestone, we will continue with the development of the terminal, which when inaugurated, will have doubled the Departure waiting area. In addition to a more spacious area for arriving, departing and transit passengers, Curaçao International Airport will gain an additional bridge that will be able to accommodate process and offer services to large wide-body aircraft. 
In addition, a second Mirador will be placed on the expanded part of the Terminal, ideal for enjoying plane spotting with family and friends or for photography.

Economic and social impact
CAP realizes the impact the airport developments have on Curaçao’s economy, and as the airport operator is committed to jointly offer an enhanced and improved facility and service, positioning Curaçao as a more competitive airport in the Caribbean region.

The start date of the complete construction work for the Terminal Expansion Project [terminal and continuation with the expansion of the middle part of the airport] was the second Quarter of 2016. The end date of the complete construction work (including new immigration Departures area) is set in December 2018.
The start date of the terminal expansion/bridge construction work was June 2016. The end date is set for January 2018.
When the Terminal area is operational, CAP and CAH will have offered more space (double the capacity) in the waiting area with facilities that enhance the comfort and experience of the traveler as well as more shopping and food & beverage facilities.
CAP will also be able to offer a 6th bridge for major wide body airplanes. Here after CAP will continue with the expansion which includes separate routes for arriving or transit passengers and a new spacious area for Departing Area Immigration among others.

The aim is to be able to process 2.5 Million travelers.

Investment
Curaçao Airport Partners (private company) invests 25 million dollars in the Terminal Expansion. CAH also invested an additional 10 million dollars in the Terminal Expansion Project.

Airlines and destinations

Passenger

Cargo

Statistics

Coast Guard Air Station Hato
Located at the west side of Hato Airport there are hangars for the two Bombardier Dash 8 Maritime Patrol Aircraft and two AgustaWestland AW139 helicopters of the Dutch Caribbean Coast Guard. This was, until 2007, a naval airbase of the Royal Netherlands Navy which operated the base for 55 years. With a wide variety of aircraft in the past years Fireflies, Avengers, Trackers, Neptunes, Fokker F-27's, P-3C Orions, Fokker F-60's and several helicopters. After the political decision to sell all Orions the airbase wasn't needed anymore.

The west end of the airport is a USAF Forward Operating Base (FOB). The base hosts AWACS and transport aircraft. Until 1999 the USAF operated a small fleet of F-16 fighters from the FOB.

References

External links

 
 

Airports in Curaçao
Airfields of the United States Army Air Forces
Willemstad